Calvillo is a city in the Mexican state of Aguascalientes. The town serves as the municipal seat of the surrounding municipality of Calvillo. Calvillo is the second most populated city in the state, surpassed in importance only by the capital city. It is located about 52 kilometers from the city of Aguascalientes.

History

Demographics
As of 2010, Calvillo had a total population of 19,742,

Tourism
Calvillo has a number of attractions of interest to tourists. One of them is the Main Square, which dates from 1778 and is famous for its orange trees. Calvillo is also home to the Temple of Our Lord of the Salitre; built in 1772, its interior features paintings that are considered jewels of religious art. The attractive dome topping the church has an exceptional size and diameter. Its rarest feature is that it is made as a single architectural piece; there are only five domes of this style worldwide. The interior of the dome features exquisite frescoes depicting the life of St. Joseph, the patron saint of the city. The Guadalupe Temple is another important church featuring majestic towers.

Another interesting place is the Malpaso Dam. The outskirts of Calvillo are a magnet for tourists. The Sierra del Laurel, south of the town, is a prolongation of Sierra Fría and highly sought-after by rock climbers because of its steep sides. Also nearby are the La Cordorniz Dam, and the ex-convent of the Tepozán, where, at the bottom of the gully, there is a rocky area with cave paintings. The prehistoric paintings of El Tepozan show diverse figures in different colors imprinted in various eras. Very close to these two attractions, in the town of La Panadera and chikis  it is still practiced the old craft of embroidery and unthreading or "deshilados", the state's craft by excellence.

Calvillo has the leading position in exports of guava Mexico and famous for its superb confectionery and liqueurs made from this fruit, which you can sample at the Guava Fair held during the first week of December.

The economy in Calvillo is centered on the guava, although there is other agriculture and a great deal of commerce.  Calvillo is better known as the world capital of the guava.
Calvillo has also been hit by floods in 1991 and 2008 causing damage (Estimated cost combined by inflation is 67 million.)
People from Calvillo are called "calvillenses".

Geography

Climate

Notes
Link to tables of population data from Census of 2005 INEGI: Instituto Nacional de Estadística, Geografía e Informática
Aguascalientes Enciclopedia de los Municipios de México
www.myspace.com/calvisranch for a Spanish version of the history of Calvillo

References

External links
 https://web.archive.org/web/20180225064932/http://www.livevideo.com/liveshow/calvillo.publicidad  INTERACTIVO WEBCAM CHAT EN VIVO Y VIDEOS
Ayuntamiento de Calvillo Official website
http://calvillo.blogspot.com
https://web.archive.org/web/20190121024015/https://calvillo.com.mx/
http://calvillo.sdmexico.com
Gobierno del Estado de Aguascalientes Official website of State of Aguascalientes
http://www.calvilloweb.com
 https://web.archive.org/web/20081121201222/http://www.livevideo.com/liveshow/calvillo
 http://www.myspace.com/calvisranch

Populated places in Aguascalientes
Pueblos Mágicos